Alexander Buch (born 12 May 1988 in Munich) is a German footballer who currently plays for TSV Grünwald. He made his debut on the professional league level in the 2. Bundesliga with FC Ingolstadt 04 on 20 February 2009 when he came on as a substitute for Valdet Rama in the 68th minute in a game against Alemannia Aachen.

References

External links
 

1988 births
Living people
German footballers
FC Ingolstadt 04 players
SSV Jahn Regensburg players
SpVgg Unterhaching players
SV Elversberg players
2. Bundesliga players
3. Liga players
Association football midfielders
FC Ingolstadt 04 II players
SpVgg Unterhaching II players
Footballers from Munich